Aalborg Commuter Rail is a commuter rail service in and near Aalborg, Denmark. The service started in 2003 and is operated by the Danish State Railways. There is one line, from Lindholm station in Nørresundby to Skørping, which runs on the mainline Randers-Aalborg Line and Vendsyssel Line.

Trains depart twice per hour during daytime, once per hour weekends. Some trains are regional trains which go Frederikshavn-Aarhus. A link to Aalborg Airport was opened in 2020.

Diesel trainsets are used, for example DSB class MR or IC3.

See also
 List of commuter rail systems

External links

 Banedanmark
 DSB
 Nordjyllands Jernbaner

Regional rail in Denmark
2003 establishments in Denmark
Railway services introduced in 2003
Rail transport in the North Jutland Region
Transport in Aalborg